The Jacobs R-755 (company designation L-4) is a seven-cylinder, air-cooled, radial engine for aircraft manufactured in the United States by the Jacobs Aircraft Engine Company.

Design and development

The R-755 was first run in 1933 and was still in production in the 1970s. With a bore and stroke of 5.25 in × 5 in (133 mm × 127 mm) the displacement was 757 cu in (12.4 L), power ranged from 200 hp to 350 hp (150 kW - 260 kW). The engine features steel cylinders with aluminum-alloy cylinder heads. An R-755E variant was developed for use in helicopters.

Variants
R-755A1The base-line direct drive production version.
R-755A2300 hp variant.
R-755A3Similar to A1 but with Scintilla magnetoes.
R-755B1De-rated version of the R-755A to drive a fixed pitch airscrew.
R-755B2De-rated version of the R-755A to drive a variable or controllable pitch airscrew.
R-755EUp-rated engine with reduction gearing.
R-755EHDeveloped to power the Jacobs Type 104 Gyrodyne.

Applications
 Anahuac Tauro
 Beechcraft Model 17 Staggerwing (B17L, C17L, E17L)
 Boeing-Stearman PT-18 Kaydet
 Cessna AT-17 Bobcat
 Cessna 195
 Funk F-23
 Grumman G-164 Ag Cat
 Kellett KD-1
 Lascurain Aura
 Morane-Saulnier MS.505 Criquet
 Waco F series (YMF, YPF)
 Waco Custom Cabin series (YOC, YQC)
 Waco Standard Cabin series (YKC, YKC-S, YKS-6)
 Waco PG-3 (twin-engined powered version of Waco CG-15 glider, prototype only)

Engines on display
 A preserved Jacobs R-755 is on display at the Arkansas Air Museum.
 A Jacobs R-755 is on public display at the Aerospace Museum of California
A preserved Jacobs R-755 is on display at Super T Aviation Academy in Medicine Hat, Canada.
 A restored Jacobs R-755A is on display at the House of Whitley.

Specifications (R-755-A1)

See also

References

External links

 The Jacobs Engine - Nanton Lancaster Society
 FAA Type Data Certificate Sheet - R-755
 Jacobs Engine Powered Plymouth Truck

1930s aircraft piston engines
Aircraft air-cooled radial piston engines
Jacobs aircraft engines